Malic enzyme may refer to decarboxylating malate dehydrogenases:

 Malate dehydrogenase (decarboxylating) or NAD-malic enzyme
 Malate dehydrogenase (oxaloacetate-decarboxylating), another NAD-malic enzyme
 Malate dehydrogenase (oxaloacetate-decarboxylating) (NADP+) or NADP-malic enzyme 

including

 D-malate dehydrogenase (decarboxylating)